Samuel Sandys, 1st Baron Sandys  (10 August 1695 – 21 April 1770), was a British Whig politician who represented Worcester in the House of Commons from 1718 until 1743, when he was created Baron Sandys. He held numerous posts in the government of the United Kingdom, namely Chancellor of the Exchequer, Leader of the House of Commons, Cofferer of the Household and First Lord of Trade. He was also a justice in eyre.

Early life
Sandys was the eldest son of Edwin Sandys  (himself a descendant of Edwin Sandys, Archbishop of York), and his wife Alice, daughter of Sir James Rushout .

He was educated at New College, Oxford, matriculating in 1711 aged 16. He left Oxford in 1715 without graduating, and embarked on a Grand Tour of Continental Europe.

Opposition
In 1718, at the age of 22, Sandys was elected MP for Worcester, as a Whig. He represented the seat for 25 years.

Initially a supporter of Robert Walpole's government, in 1725 Sandys and his uncle Sir John Rushout went into opposition with William Pulteney. Sandys was seen as second-in-command to Pulteney, the leader of the Patriot Whigs.

In February 1730 Sandys introduced the Pension Bill, to bar from sitting in the House of Commons anyone with any pensions or offices held in trust for them from the Crown. The bill passed through the House of Commons but was rejected by the House of Lords; he reintroduced the bill several times in subsequent sessions, with the same result. Sandys opposed the government's economic policy: in 1733 he opposed both the motion to take £500,000 from the sinking fund and the Excise Bill to tax tobacco and wine imports; in February 1736 he called attention to the increase of the national debt.

On 13 February 1741, Sandys moved a motion to call upon King George II to dismiss Walpole. The Tories did not support the motion, which was defeated by 290 votes to 106; the Tory Jacobite William Shippen commented of Walpole and the opposition Whigs that "Robin and I are two honest men: he is for King George and I for King James, but those men in long cravats only desire places under either one or the other".

Chancellor of the Exchequer
This impression that senior opposition Whigs were motivated by self-advancement rather than by opposition to the government gained substance when Walpole fell in February 1742. Pulteney (created Earl of Bath that year) brokered a deal with the Court, without consulting opposition parties. The new ministry led by Lord Wilmington was a continuation of Walpole's ministry with few personnel changes, but with Sandys appointed Chancellor of the Exchequer, and Sir John Rushout and Phillips Gybbon appointed Lords of the Treasury.

Pulteney and Sandys supported the appointment of a secret committee to investigate Walpole's conduct in office; Sandys was elected a member of the committee. They opposed the repeal of the Septennial Act 1716, and objected to the rejection by the Lords of the Indemnification Bill to recompense witnesses against Walpole. In December 1742 Sandys opposed a Place Bill (to limit the capacity of parliamentarians to hold other paid positions, especially in the military), although he had proposed several such bills when in opposition.

Wilmington died in July 1743, succeeded as First Lord of the Treasury by Henry Pelham. On 12 December 1743, Pelham took the Chancellorship himself.

Later career
Sandys was compensated with a peerage, being created Baron Sandys on 20 December 1743, and appointed as Cofferer of the Household. He later held office as Speaker of the House of Lords in the Pitt–Devonshire ministry (November 1756 – July 1757), and as First Lord of Trade under Lords Newcastle and Bute (March 1761 – February 1763).

Sandys died on 21 April 1770, from injuries sustained when his post chaise overturned on Highgate Hill.

Family
On 9 June 1725 Sandys married Letitia, eldest daughter and co-heiress of Sir Thomas Tipping  and his wife Anne Cheke. They had seven sons and three daughters:

 Edwin Sandys (28 April 1726 – 11 March 1797), MP, succeeded as the 2nd Baron Sandys in 1770
 Cheek Sandys (1727–1737)
 Thomas Sandys (born 30 September 1728, London, died in infancy)
 Martin Sandys (baptised 24 November 1729, Ombersley – 26 December 1768), Colonel, Equerry to the Duke of Cumberland
 Martin's daughter Mary (wife of Arthur Hill, 2nd Marquess of Downshire) inherited the Ombersley estates upon the 2nd Baron's death in 1797, and was granted a new Sandys barony in 1802.
 Letitia Sandys (baptised 25 August 1731, Ombersley – 10 January 1784)
 William Sandys (baptised 5 August 1732, Ombersley – 31 October 1749)
 Anne Sandys (born 10 January 1734 – 1797) married Christopher Bethell
 John Sandys (baptised 31 October 1735, Ombersley – 1758), soldier, died in Germany
 Katherine Sandys (baptised 25 September 1736, died in infancy)
 Henry Sandys (baptised 4 July 1737, Ombersley, died in infancy)

References

Bibliography

External links
 

1695 births
1770 deaths
Alumni of New College, Oxford
18th-century English nobility
Peers of Great Britain created by George II
Sandys, Samuel
Sandys, Samuel
Sandys, Samuel
Sandys, Samuel
Sandys, Samuel
Chancellors of the Exchequer of Great Britain
Sandys, Samuel
Members of the Privy Council of Great Britain
People from Greenwich
People from Wychavon (district)
Leaders of the House of Commons of Great Britain
Presidents of the Board of Trade
Road incident deaths in London
Free speech activists
Whig (British political party) politicians
Samuel